Some milestones in the history of rebetiko are listed below:

Births 
1885 – Georgios Batis, Maria Panagia
1893 – Iovan Tsaous
1897 – Vangelis Papazoglou
1900 – Spyros Peristeris
1903 – Dimitris Gongos
1905 – Markos Vamvakaris
1914 – Yiannis Papaioannou
1914 – Rita Abatzi
1915 – Vassilis Tsitsanis
1917 – Michalis Jenitsaris
1918 – Marika Ninou
1920 – Manolis Hiotis

Deaths 
1942 – Iovan Tsaous
1943 – Vangelis Papazoglou
1956 – Marika Ninou
1966 – Spyros Peristeris
1967 – Giorgos Batis
1969 – Rita Abatzi
1972 – Markos Vamvakaris
1972 – Yiannis Papaioannou
1980 – Roza Eskenazi
1984 -Vassilis Tsitsanis
1997 -Soteria Bellou
2005 – Michalis Jenitsaris

Events 
1922 – Asia Minor Disaster
1923 – Treaty of Lausanne and population exchanges between Greece and Turkey.
1933 – The first recording with bouzouki in Greece by Giorgos Batis. The disc is not released right away.
1934 – Markos Vamvakaris records "Na'rhosouna re manga mou", his first disc.
1947 – Vassilis Tsitsanis records "Synefiasmeni Kyriaki"

See also 
Rebetiko
List of rebetic songs

Greek music
Rebetiko
Rebetika
Rebetika